St Katherine's Church, Plaistow was a Church of England church on Chapman Road in Plaistow, Newham. It opened in 1891 as a mission church of St Mary's Church, Plaistow, using a building that had earlier been used to house the infant department of that church's day schools. In 1894 a permanent church was completed. In 1965 it was demolished for redevelopment.

References
A History of the County of Essex: Volume 6. Originally published by Victoria County History, London, 1973; Pages 114-123

St Katherine's
St Katherine's
Former churches in London
Former Church of England church buildings
Church of England church buildings in Plaistow
19th-century Church of England church buildings